The Calgary Roughnecks are a lacrosse team based in Calgary playing in the National Lacrosse League (NLL). The 2008 season was the 7th in franchise history. The Roughnecks finished 3rd in the West Division, making the playoffs for the sixth straight season. They defeated the Colorado Mammoth in the division semifinals, but were eliminated when they lost 16-12 to the Portland LumberJax in the division final in Calgary.

Regular season

Conference standings

Game log
Reference:

Playoffs

Game log
Reference:

Player stats
Reference:

Runners (Top 10)

Note: GP = Games played; G = Goals; A = Assists; Pts = Points; LB = Loose balls; PIM = Penalty minutes

Goaltenders
Note: GP = Games played; MIN = Minutes; W = Wins; L = Losses; GA = Goals against; Sv% = Save percentage; GAA = Goals against average

Awards

Trades

Roster

See also
2008 NLL season

References

Calgary